David Greenidge (date of birth unknown) is a former Bermudian cricketer. Greenidge's batting and bowling styles are unknown.

Greenidge made his debut for Bermuda in a List A match against Trinidad and Tobago in the 1998–99 Red Stripe Bowl. He made a further List A appearance in that tournament against the Windward Islands, scoring a total of 14 runs in his two List A matches with a high score of 10.

References

External links
David Greenidge at ESPNcricinfo
David Greenidge at CricketArchive

Living people
Bermudian cricketers
Year of birth missing (living people)